Dott is a Dutch-French micromobility company based in Amsterdam which was founded in January 2019. Dott operates over 50,000 shared electric scooters and electric bikes in more than 35 cities in Europe. Dott is one of the three companies that are authorized to operate rentals of electric scooters in London during a one year trial of the use of e-scooters.

History 

Dott was founded in September 2019 by Henri Moissinac and Maxim Romain. It had its Series A round of funding in 2019, raising €30 million led by EQT Ventures and Naspers; this was followed by a Series B round in April for $85 million, led by Sofina.

The company was selected along with companies TIER and Lime to participate in a year-long trial of the use of e-scooters as a method of transportation in London. It will deploy up to 6,600 scooters there during the course of the trial, which will be available for rental use via an app.

References

External links

Dutch companies established in 2019
Companies based in Amsterdam
Scooter sharing companies
Transport companies established in 2019